Harsiese was a High Priest of Ptah during the 21st Dynasty. Harsiese is sometimes referred to as Harsiese J.

Harsiese is known from the Genealogy of Ankhefensekhmet, where he is said to be a contemporary of Pharaoh Psusennes I. He is also mentioned in a genealogy from the Louvre.

References

Publications Regarding Berlin 23673 and Louvre 96 
 L Borchardt, Die Mittel zur Zeitlichen Festlegung von Punkten de Aegyptischen Geschichte und ihre Anwendung, 1935, pg 96-112
 E Chassinat, Recueil de travaux relatifs à la philologie et à l'archéologie égyptiennes et assyriennes, 22 (1900) 16-17, No 54
 Malinines, Posner, Vercoutter, Catalogue des steles de Sérapéum de Memphis, I, 1968, No. 52, pp. 48–49
 Kees, Zeitschrift fur Agyptischer Sprache, 87 (1962), 146-9

Memphis High Priests of Ptah
People of the Twenty-first Dynasty of Egypt
11th-century BC clergy